This is a list of Superfund sites in Colorado designated under the Comprehensive Environmental Response, Compensation, and Liability Act (CERCLA) environmental law.  The CERCLA federal law of 1980 authorized the United States Environmental Protection Agency (EPA) to create a list of polluted locations requiring a long-term response to clean up hazardous material contaminations.   These locations are known as Superfund sites, and are placed on the National Priorities List (NPL).

The NPL guides the EPA in "determining which sites warrant further investigation" for environmental remediation.  As of May 1, 2010, there were eighteen Superfund sites on the National Priorities List in Colorado.  Two more sites have been proposed for entry on the list and three others have been cleaned up and removed from it.

Superfund sites

See also
List of Superfund sites in the United States
List of environmental issues
List of waste types
TOXMAP

References

External links
EPA list of proposed Superfund sites in Colorado
EPA list of current Superfund sites in Colorado
EPA list of Superfund site construction completions in Colorado
EPA list of partially deleted Superfund sites in Colorado
EPA list of deleted Superfund sites in Colorado
Information on the "Denver Radium Streets" Project

Superfund
Colorado